Bjorn "BJ" McKie (born April 7, 1977) is an American former professional basketball player and current assistant coach at Wake Forest. Born in Norfolk, Virginia, McKie went to high school at Irmo High School and played for the University of South Carolina men's basketball team. In January 1999, he became the Gamecocks' all-time leading scorer, surpassing Alex English. The college retired his number 3 jersey in 2005. His son, Justin McKie, also starred at Irmo, and followed in his father's footsteps, playing four years at South Carolina.

American minor leagues
After his college career, McKie was drafted by the Connecticut Pride of the Continental Basketball Association. He played for them from 1999 to 2001, and appeared in the 2001 CBA All-Star Game. In 2001–02, McKie played for the North Charleston Lowgators (now the Florida Flame) of the NBA Development League.

International career
Internationally, McKie has played for BCM Gravelines in France; Keravnos in Cyprus; Avitos Giessen and TBB Trier in Germany; Zarotti Imola, Pepsi Caserta and Nuova Pallacanestro Pavia in Italy; and Maccabi Haifa Heat and Hapoel Afula in Israel. He left Hapoel Afula in 2010.

While playing in Germany, McKie was a Basketball Bundesliga All-Star in 2004.

References

External links
ESPN Draft Profile

1977 births
Living people
20th-century African-American sportspeople
21st-century African-American sportspeople
African-American basketball players
American expatriate basketball people in Argentina
American expatriate basketball people in Cyprus
American expatriate basketball people in France
American expatriate basketball people in Germany
American expatriate basketball people in Israel
American expatriate basketball people in Italy
American men's basketball players
Basketball coaches from Virginia
Basketball players from Norfolk, Virginia
BCM Gravelines players
Charleston Lowgators players
Charleston Southern Buccaneers men's basketball coaches
East Tennessee State Buccaneers men's basketball coaches
Giessen 46ers players
Gimnasia y Esgrima de Comodoro Rivadavia basketball players
Hapoel Afula players
Israeli Basketball Premier League players
Maccabi Haifa B.C. players
Pallacanestro Pavia players
Parade High School All-Americans (boys' basketball)
People from Irmo, South Carolina
Point guards
South Carolina Gamecocks men's basketball players
Sportspeople from Norfolk, Virginia
Wake Forest Demon Deacons men's basketball coaches